Shixing may refer to:

Shixing County, Guangdong Province, China
Liu Jun, Prince Shixing, (429–453), imperial prince of the Chinese dynasty Liu Song
Shixing language
Siheung, South Korea